The Illegal is an IBA official cocktail.

See also
 List of cocktails

References

Cocktails with rum
Cocktails with liqueur
Cocktails with mezcal